The Federal Reserve Bank of Atlanta Jacksonville Branch Office is one of the five Federal Reserve Bank of Atlanta branch offices. The Jacksonville branch is part of the 6th District.

The Jacksonville Branch currently conducts tours by appointment. Admission is free.

Current Board of Directors
The following people are on the board of directors as of 2013:

Appointed by the Federal Reserve Bank

Appointed by the Board of Governors

See also

 Federal Reserve Act
 Federal Reserve System
 Federal Reserve Bank
 Federal Reserve Districts
 Federal Reserve Branches
 Federal Reserve Bank of Atlanta
 Federal Reserve Bank of Atlanta Birmingham Branch Office
 Federal Reserve Bank of Atlanta Miami Branch Office
 Federal Reserve Bank of Atlanta New Orleans Branch Office
 Federal Reserve Bank of Atlanta Nashville Branch Office
 Architecture of Jacksonville

References

External links
Official website

Federal Reserve branches
Downtown Jacksonville
LaVilla, Jacksonville